ABF may refer to:

Organizations
 ABF Freight System, an American company
 Africa Badminton Federation
 American Bar Foundation
 Arbetarnas bildningsförbund, Swedish for "Workers' Educational Association"
 Argentina Boxing Federation
 Army Benevolent Fund
 Artists' Benevolent Fund
 Associated British Foods
 Australian Baseball Federation
 Australian Border Force

Other uses
 Abai Sungai language, an Austronesian language of Malaysia
 Abaiang Airport, Abaiang, Kiribati
Academy for Business and Finance, part of high school Bergen County Academies in New Jersey, United States
 Ammonium bifluoride
 Amorphous brazing foil
 Applications-By-Forms, a component of CA-OpenIngres
 Availability-based tariff
 Aviation boatswain's mate, fuels